Jean Pierre Mvuyekure is a Rwandan long-distance runner. At the 2012 Summer Olympics, he competed in the Men's marathon, finishing in 79th place. He placed third at the Pyongyang Marathon in 2013.

References

Living people
1984 births
Rwandan male long-distance runners
Rwandan male marathon runners
Olympic athletes of Rwanda
Athletes (track and field) at the 2012 Summer Olympics
Commonwealth Games competitors for Rwanda
Athletes (track and field) at the 2014 Commonwealth Games